Anthony D'Amelio is an American politician. He served as a Republican member of the Connecticut House of Representatives, first elected in a 1996 special election, and re-elected in every regular election from then until 2020. In 2007, he ran for Mayor of Waterbury. However, he came in third losing to incumbent Michael Jarjura and Independent Party of Connecticut candidate Dennis Odle. He resigned from office on December 31, 2021, to focus on work at his restaurant in Waterbury.

References

Living people
Republican Party members of the Connecticut House of Representatives
Politicians from Waterbury, Connecticut
21st-century American politicians
1964 births